Marc McCarroll (born 19 February 1985) is a Harrow-born British wheelchair tennis player who won the British Open in 2014.

Early life
McCarroll was born to a family of athletes. In 2003, he was injured in a car accident and 2 years later joined wheelchair tennis. Prior to a car accident he was association football player for Arsenal F.C.

Career
In 2012, he won against Gordon Reid at South African Open in three sets: 4–6, 6–2, 6–3.

In 2014 while playing doubles along with Kanako Domori of Japan, he won the 2014 Wimbledon Championship. Previously, he defeated another Japanese player named Takuya Miki. Currently, he is scheduled to play against Shingo Kunieda, another player from the same country.

References

External links
 
 

1985 births
Living people
People with paraplegia
British male tennis players
British wheelchair tennis players
Paralympic wheelchair tennis players of Great Britain
Wheelchair tennis players at the 2016 Summer Paralympics
Tennis people from Greater London